Uganda Federal Alliance is a national political party in Uganda which was registered to Electoral Commission of Uganda on July 19, 2010.

Seats in Parliament 
In the 2011 Ugandan general election, this party was in fifth place in presidential race. In 2016 Ugandan general election, Uganda Federal Alliance got six seats in Parliament of Uganda.

References

Political parties in Uganda